Living in the Hothouse: How Global Warming Affects Australia is a 2005 book by Professor Ian Lowe which is a sequel to his Living in the Greenhouse (1989).  The book presents a detailed analysis of climate change science and the likely impact of climate change in Australia.   Living in the Hothouse also offers a critical overview of  the Howard government's policy response to climate change in Australia.

Ian Lowe, AO, is a scientist, environmental policy analyst, and president of the Australian Conservation Foundation, who has served on many federal, state and local government committees.

Other books by Ian Lowe include Reaction Time and A Big Fix.

See also

List of Australian environmental books
Climate change in Australia

References

Australian non-fiction books
Environmental non-fiction books
2005 non-fiction books
2005 in the environment
Climate change books
Books by Ian Lowe
Books about Australian natural history